The 2018 Asian Women's Club League Handball Championship was an international handball tournament held between 3 and 9 October 2018 in Almaty, Kazakhstan. It was organized by the Asian Handball Federation.

Participating teams

1 Bold indicates champion for that year. Italics indicates host.

Results
All times are local (UTC+6).

References

External links
 Results (Archived)

Asian Handball Championships
Asian Women's Club League Handball Championship
Asia
Asian Women's Club League Handball Championship
2018 Asian Women's Club League Handball Championship